Bernard Tom Hadfield (11 December 1934 – 16 May 2018) was a New Zealand rugby league footballer who represented New Zealand in the 1957 and 1960 World Cups and retired as the highest try-scorer in the New Zealand national side's history.

Playing career
A Northcote Tigers player, Hadfield was an Auckland representative. He was part of the Northcote club during the Auckland Rugby League's district era and so played for Northern Districts - an amalgamation of the Northcote and North Shore clubs.

Hadfield first made the New Zealand national rugby league team in 1956. He went on to play 15 Tests for the Kiwis, including at the 1957 and 1960 World Cups. After the 1960 World Cup Tom played for the Rest of the World vs Great Britain. He finished his career with a then-record 15 tries for the Kiwis, five more than the previous record. As of 2010 he is 6th equal highest try scorer for the Kiwis.

Legacy and death
Hadfield was inducted into the New Zealand Rugby League's "Legends of League" in 2010. In 2009 he was named as a member of the New Zealand Rugby League Team of the Century and in 2010 he was made a Legends of Harbour by Harbour Sport.

Hadfield died in the Auckland suburb of Birkenhead on 16 May 2018, aged 83.

References

1934 births
2018 deaths
New Zealand rugby league players
New Zealand national rugby league team players
Northcote Tigers players
North Harbour rugby league team players
Auckland rugby league team players
Rugby league players from Auckland
Rugby league wingers